Year of the Horse is a 1997 American documentary film directed by Jim Jarmusch, following Neil Young and Crazy Horse on their 1996 tour. An accompanying live album by Neil Young & Crazy Horse was released in 1997. It offers a different track listing than the film.

Cast
 Neil Young
 Poncho Sampedro
 Billy Talbot
 Ralph Molina

Release
The film had its world premiere at the 1997 San Francisco International Film Festival on May 8, 1997. It was released in the United States on October 8, 1997.

Reception
On review aggregator website Rotten Tomatoes, the film holds an approval rating of 48% based on 25 reviews, with a weighted average rating of 5.2/10. The website's critical consensus reads, "Year of the Horse might be worth a watch for hardcore fans of Neil Young or Jim Jarmusch, but it will likely test the patience of most other viewers." Roger Ebert named "Year of the Horse" as the worst movie of 1997. The film has a weighted average score of 58 out of 100, based on 14 critics, indicating "mixed or average reviews".

Live album
An accompanying album was released in 1997.

References

External links
 
 
 Interview with Jim Jarmusch and Larry A. Johnson

1997 films
American rock music films
Neil Young live albums
Films directed by Jim Jarmusch
Documentary film soundtracks
1997 live albums
1997 soundtrack albums
Reprise Records live albums
Reprise Records soundtracks
Concert films
Albums produced by Neil Young
Albums produced by Frank Sampedro
Albums produced by Billy Talbot
Albums produced by Ralph Molina
Crazy Horse (band) albums
1990s English-language films
1990s American films